The 1989 Southern Miss Golden Eagles football team was an American football team that represented the University of Southern Mississippi as an independent during the 1989 NCAA Division I-A football season. In their second year under head coach Curley Hallman, the team compiled a 5–6 record.

The 1989 Golden Eagles, led offensively by quarterback Brett Favre and defensively by linebacker Orlando Harris, had one of the biggest upsets of the college football season when they beat Florida State by a score of 30–26. In a game against Louisville, Southern Miss was on its own 21-yard line with six seconds left in a 10–10 tie. This was the result of a missed field goal by Louisville would have given them the lead. Favre threw a Hail Mary pass that was deflected, but it bounced off the helmet of Southern Mississippi's Michael Jackson and into the hands of wide receiver Darryl Tillman, who scored a touchdown with no time left. The play was later voted on as one of the "Top 5 Memorable Moments" in college football history in an online vote at ESPN.com.

Schedule

Roster

Season summary

Florida State

Team players in the NFL

Brett Favre, Michael Jackson and Simmie Carter would be drafted in the 1991 NFL Draft.

References

Southern Miss
Southern Miss Golden Eagles football seasons
Southern Miss Golden Eagles football